The Ricardo Alarid House, at 534 Alarid St. in Santa Fe, New Mexico, was built in 1902.  It was listed on the National Register of Historic Places in 1984.

References

National Register of Historic Places in Santa Fe County, New Mexico
Houses completed in 1902
Houses in Santa Fe County, New Mexico
Buildings and structures in Santa Fe, New Mexico
1902 establishments in New Mexico Territory